Events in the year 1934 in Portugal.

Incumbents
President: Óscar Carmona
Prime Minister: António de Oliveira Salazar

Events

 16 June to 30 September – Portuguese colonial exhibition held in Oporto.
 16 December – Portuguese legislative election, 1934.

Arts and entertainment

Sports
The Primeira Liga established
The club Associação Cultural e Recreativa Alvorense 1º Dezembro founded
The club Grupo Desportivo Torralta founded
The club FC Infesta founded
The club F.C. Lixa founded
The club SC Lamego founded

Births

19 July – Francisco de Sá Carneiro, politician
21 July – Américo Amorim, businessman (d. 2017).

Deaths
14 March – João do Canto e Castro, naval officer and politician (born 1862)

References

 
1930s in Portugal
Portugal
Years of the 20th century in Portugal
Portugal